, known by her stage name  is a Japanese actress, voice actress and narrator from Togane, Chiba. She is currently affiliated with and representative of REMAX. Her most prominent role has been in the Sakura Wars video game franchise, where she voices Maria Tachibana. Other major roles include Ryo Takaba in Bakusō Kyōdai Let's & Go!!, Marller in Ah My Goddess, Tiger in Saber Marionette J, Musashi Kazama in Grander Musashi, Kai Hiwatari in Beyblade, and Veffidas Feaze in Macross 7. She is the mother of actress and voice actress .

Filmography

Anime
Animal Yokocho (Shimako Shima)
Anime Himitsu no Hanazono (Jim)
Bakusou Kyoudai Let's & Go!! (Ryou Takaba)
Bakuten Shoot Beyblade (Kai Hiwatari)
The Brave Fighter of Legend Da-Garn (Yancha)
Captain Tsubasa Road to 2002 (Ryo Ishizaki)
Crash B-Daman (Kodoh Kuraki)
Darker than Black (Alma)
Diamond Daydreams (Shoko Saibara)
Grander Musashi (Musashi Kazama)
HeartCatch PreCure! (Sasorina)
Hetalia: Axis Powers (Belarus)
Hunter × Hunter (1999) (Illumi Zoldyck, Ging Freecss (child))
Jang Geum's Dream (Yoon Yeong Ro)
Zatch Bell! (Zeno)
Macross 7 (Veffidas Feaze, Akiko Hojo)
Mahoujin Guru Guru (Gipple)
Moomin (Flora)
Nekketsu Saikyo Gozaurer (Kenichi Minezaki)
Oh My Goddess! (Marller)
Paradise Kiss (Risa)
Pokémon (Raichu)
Romeo's Blue Skies (Antonio)
Saber Marionette (Tiger)
Sakura Wars (Maria Tachibana)
Simoun (Wauf)
Sword Gai: The Animation (Yasuko Tanaka)
The Brave Fighter of Legend Da-Garn (Yanchar)
Turn A Gundam (Cancer Kafuka)
Yu-Gi-Oh! Duel Monsters (Insector Haga)
YuYu Hakusho (Kaisei Sato)
Fate/Extra Last Encore (Rider/Francis Drake)

OVA
Bubblegum Crisis (Kate Madigan)
Final Fantasy: Legend of the Crystals (Rouge's subordinate)
Iczer Reborn as Insect
Mega Man: Upon a Star (Proto Man)
One Piece OVA (Monkey D. Luffy)
Saber Marionette R (Edge)

Video games
Cyberbots: Full Metal Madness (Mary Miyabi)
Gunparade March (Kaori Tashiro)
James Bond 007: Everything or Nothing (Serena St. Germaine)
Kingdom Hearts 3D: Dream Drop Distance (Esmerelda)
Sakura Wars series (Maria Tachibana)
Super Robot Wars (Rejiane)
Sonic Shuffle (Void)
Valkyrie Profile (Jayle, Iseria Queen, Belinas's wife)
Fate/EXTRA (Rider/Francis Drake)
Fate/Grand Order (Francis Drake, Billy the Kid)

Dubbing roles

Live-action
Carla Gugino
Spy Kids, Ingrid Cortez
Spy Kids 2: The Island of Lost Dreams, Ingrid Cortez
Spy Kids 3-D: Game Over, Ingrid Cortez
Night at the Museum, Rebecca Hutman
Watchmen, Silk Spectre
Mr. Popper's Penguins, Amanda Popper
Helena Bonham Carter
Fight Club, Marla Singer
Harry Potter film series, Bellatrix Lestrange
Dark Shadows, Dr. Julia Hoffman
Ocean's 8, Rose Weil
Enola Holmes, Eudoria Holmes
Birds of Prey, Renee Montoya (Rosie Perez)
The Brave One, Erica Bain (Jodie Foster)
Bringing Down the House, Charlene Morton (Queen Latifah)
Chicago, Matron "Mama" Morton (Queen Latifah)
Chicago Med, Maggie Lockwood (Marlyne Barrett)
Cold Mountain (Ruby (Renée Zellweger))
Conviction, Abra Rice (Minnie Driver)
The Dilemma, Susan Warner (Queen Latifah)
DOA: Dead or Alive, Tina Armstrong (Jaime Pressly)
Ed Wood, Dolores Fuller (Sarah Jessica Parker)
ER, Sandy Lopez (Lisa Vidal)
Friends, Kristen Lang (Gabrielle Union)
Fun Size, Joy DeSantis (Chelsea Handler)
Girls of the Sun, Mathilde (Emmanuelle Bercot)
Grey's Anatomy, Dr. Bailey (Chandra Wilson)
The Haunting, Eleanor "Nell" Vance (Lili Taylor)
High Crimes, Jackie Grimaldi (Amanda Peet)
Hollywoodland, Leonore Lemmon (Robin Tunney)
Idiocracy, Rita (Maya Rudolph)
Just Wright, Leslie Wright (Queen Latifah)
The League of Extraordinary Gentlemen, Mina Harker (Peta Wilson)
Lethal Weapon, Trish Murtaugh (Keesha Sharp)
Marmaduke, Mazie (Emma Stone)
Miami Vice, Trudy Joplin (Naomie Harris)
Monster Hunt, Ying (Sandra Ng)
Mrs. America, Shirley Chisholm (Uzo Aduba)
Pirates of the Caribbean film series (Tia Dalma (Naomie Harris))
Popstar: Never Stop Never Stopping, Mariah Carey
The Rebound, Laura (Lynn Whitfield)
Star Trek: Picard, Rafaella "Raffi" Musiker (Michelle Hurd)
Talk to Her, Lydia González (Rosario Flores)
Venom, Maria (Melora Walters)
Where the Wild Things Are, Connie (Catherine Keener)
Wolfe, DCI Betsy Chambers (Christine Tremarco)

Animation
Chuggington, Decka
A Goofy Movie, P.J.
Home, Lucy Tucci
Luca, Daniela Paguro
Madagascar 3: Europe's Most Wanted, Dubois
Raya and the Last Dragon, Sisu

References

External links
 
 
Urara Takano at Hitoshi Doi's seiyuu database
Urara Takano at Ryu's Seiyuu Info

1961 births
Living people
People from Tōgane
Voice actresses from Chiba Prefecture
Japanese video game actresses
Japanese voice actresses
20th-century Japanese actresses
21st-century Japanese actresses
Ken Production voice actors